The Trofeo Birra Moretti (Birra Moretti Trophy) was an annual football friendly tournament that had been organised and sponsored by Birra Moretti from 1997 to 2008. The teams played three round-robin matches lasting 45-minutes each. If any match ended in a draw, it was decided by shoot-outs or penalties (as in 2008 edition).

After 2008, the event has not taken place anymore. Officially, Heineken Italia announced its intention to suspend it for only one year in 2009, coinciding with a change of promotional strategies at the 150th anniversary of Beer Moretti S.p.A., but was not resumed even in the following years.

Formula 

The tournament was played in 3 matches, each of 45 '(plus any recovery): the loser of the first match challenged the third team, later engaged against the winner of the opening match. In most of the editions, the matches were divided into 2 halves (from 22'30 "each) to give kickoff to each formation: the interval was also useful to the organizers for promotional and advertising purposes. If after 45 'the match was tied, there was a shoot-out (penalty in motion) with 3 executions per team and possible continuation to the bitter end. Penalty shots. The score was thus assigned :

 3 points for victory in the 45 '
 2 points for winning on penalties
 1 point for losing on penalties
 no points for the defeat in the 45 '

For tie situations in the standings, the goal difference first and the detached standings were considered first. Only the goals of the 45 minutes were counted in the goal difference.

Winners
1997: Juventus
1998: Udinese
1999: Parma
2000: Juventus
2001: Internazionale
2002: Internazionale
2003: Juventus
2004: Juventus
2005: Napoli
2006: Juventus
2007: Internazionale
2008: Juventus

Editions

2003
 3 points for win, 0 points for loss
 2 points for shoot-out win, 1 point for shoot-out loss
 Juventus F.C. wins tournament

2004
 3 points for win, 0 points for loss
 2 points for shoot-out win, 1 point for shoot-out loss
 Juventus F.C. wins tournament

2005
 3 points for win, 0 points for loss
 2 points for shoot-out win, 1 point for shoot-out loss
 S.S.C. Napoli wins tournament

2006
 3 points for win, 0 points for loss
 2 points for shoot-out win, 1 point for shoot-out loss
 Juventus F.C. wins tournament

2007
 3 points for win, 0 points for loss
 2 points for shoot-out win, 1 point for shoot-out loss
 F.C. Internazionale Milano wins tournament

2008
 3 points for win, 0 points for loss
 2 points for penalty kick win, 1 point for penalty kick loss
 Juventus F.C. wins tournament based on head-to-head result

Gunners
The best mark in the event is Christian Vieri with 6 goals, all made with the Inter shirt.

Television
All editions of the Birra Moretti Trophy were transmitted in clear and exclusive channels from Mediaset (sometimes Canale 5, sometimes Italia 1, in some editions the first minigirl was transmitted by Italy 1 and the other two by Channel 5).

References

Defunct Italian football friendly trophies